Liede Bridge South station, is a station of Haizhu Tram of the Guangzhou Metro. It started operations on 31 December 2014.

Station layout

References

Railway stations in China opened in 2014
Guangzhou Metro stations in Haizhu District